Joanna Miles (born March 6, 1940) is an American actress. She received two Emmy Awards for her portrayal of Laura Wingfield in the 1973 film production of Tennessee Williams' The Glass Menagerie.

Early life and education
Miles was born in Nice, France, the daughter of Jeanne Patterson Miles, an American painter, and Johannes Schiefer, a French painter and art curator. She immigrated to the United States, and was naturalized a citizen, in 1941. She graduated from The Putney School, a progressive independent high school in Putney, Vermont, in 1958. She was accepted into the Actors Studio, where she studied alongside Al Pacino, Robert De Niro, and Dustin Hoffman.

Acting career
Miles won two Emmy Awards for her portrayal of Laura Wingfield in the 1973 film production of Tennessee Williams' The Glass Menagerie: the Super Emmy for Best Supporting Actress in Drama, and Supporting Actress of the Year.

She has also played supporting roles in various movies, including The Way We Live Now (1970), Bug (1975), The Ultimate Warrior (1975), The Dark Secret of Harvest Home (1978), A Fire in the Sky (1978), Cross Creek (1983), Blackout (1988), Rosencrantz & Guildenstern are Dead (1990), Above Suspicion (1995), Judge Dredd (1995) and Sex and Breakfast (2007). She is known to Star Trek: The Next Generation fans as Perrin, Sarek's wife, from the episodes "Sarek" and "Unification".

In 2001, she had a secondary role as the wife of a storekeeper in Tom Selleck's Turner Network Television Western film, Crossfire Trail. She was also in an episode of The Incredible Hulk entitled "The Quiet Room" and in the episode "Murder on the Flip Side" of the NBC crime drama The Eddie Capra Mysteries.

Personal life
Miles married William Burns in May 1970; they divorced in 1977. She remarried to film producer Michael Brandman in 1978; they have one son, Miles Brandman.

Filmography

References

External links

Joanna Miles at the University of Wisconsin's Actors Studio audio collection

American film actresses
American television actresses
French emigrants to the United States
Outstanding Performance by a Supporting Actress in a Drama Series Primetime Emmy Award winners
People from Nice
1940 births
Living people
The Putney School alumni
20th-century American actresses
21st-century American actresses